The Scottish Women's Rugby Union (SWRU) was the national governing body for women's rugby union in Scotland. It was responsible for the governance of women's rugby union within Scotland. Its role was all encompassing. It went from youth recruitment, through administrating all senior based (aged 16+) competition, through to the performance and management of the Scotland women's national rugby union team.

At their AGM in June 2009 the SWRU voted unanimously in favour of amalgamating the Scottish Rugby Union and the SWRU to form an integrated national governing body rugby in Scotland.

Executive Board

The SWRU was led by a volunteer based Executive Board. Board members were elected at the Annual General Meeting (AGM) at June each year. The Executive Board was renamed from the Executive Committee in the 2007 AGM.The posts were annual in nature with the exception of the Chairperson, whose post was held for 2 years. Board members had to be affiliated with a women's rugby union club.

Past Board Members
 Chairperson and Scottish Rugby Union Council:
Sandra Kinnear (Lismore WRFC) 2006-2009
 Vice-Chair: 
Rosy Hume (Murrayfield Wanderers WRFC) 2007-2009
Susan Young (Watsonians WRFC) 2006-2007
 Secretary:
Kate Ho (Edinburgh University LRFC) 2006-2009
Clare Murray 2004–2006
International Fixtures Coordinator:
Kath Vass (Watsonians WRFC) 2006-2007
Ainsley Rawlings 2002–2004
 Domestic Fixtures Coordinator:
Beth Dickens (Murrayfield Wanderers WRFC) 2006-2009
 Youth Fixtures Coordinator:
Louise Dalgeish (Royal High Corstorphine WRFC) 2006-2009
Lesley Robertson 2004-2006
Historian and Veteran Representative:
Kath Vass (Watsonians WRFC) 2007-2009
 HE/FE Coordinator:
Claire Fergusson, RHC Cougars 2007-2009
 Player Representative:
Heather Lockhart (Hillhead Jordanhill WRFC) 2007-2009

Student's Representative:
Anna Panayotopoulos (Edinburgh University LRFC) 2006-2007
Emma-Beth Wilson 2001–2003
Fiona Shanks 2000–2001
Ordinary Member:
Allan Douglas (Murrayfield Wanderers WRFC) 2006-2007

Treasurer:
Ali MacKenize 2005–2006
Sheena Buchan 2001–2002

Full time staff

In addition to the volunteer Executive Board, three full-time staff based at the Scottish Rugby Union assisted with the planning and delivery of the women's rugby union programme throughout Scotland. From 2001 to 2005 only 2 posts existed, the Women's Administration Manager and the Girls Development Officer. In 2005, in conjunction with the Scottish Rugby Union, the two posts were re-purposed, with another one created as a result. The new staffing structure consisted of a Community Manager, a Performance Development Manager (responsible for the performance pathways programme) and a Women's Development Officer (responsible for Youth and Senior rugby).

Previous full time staff

Jo Wells, Women's Community Manager, appointed July 2006–present
Jo Hull, National Performance Development Manager (women's), appointed Jan 2006–present
Car Stevenson, Women's Development Officer, appointed 2008–present

Barbara Wilson, First SWRU Administration Manager, 2001–2006
Beth MacLeod, First SWRU Girls Development Manager, 2001–2005
Claire Cruikshank, Youth Development Administrator, 2004–2006

National Competitions

In the 2010-2011 season, there were four divisions within the Scottish league: Premier League 1, Premier League 2, National League  and the National Development League.

Premier League 1

Edinburgh University
University of Dundee
Hillhead/Jordanhill
Murrayfield Wanderers
Royal High Corstorphine
Watsonians

Premier League 2

Aberdeenshire Quines
Cartha Queen's Park
Glasgow University
Kirkcaldy
Melrose
Morgan

National League

Broughton
Edinburgh University 2nds
Grangemouth
Lismore
Oban Lorne
Royal Dick Veterinary College
Saints, The (Madras College FP RFC)
Stirling County

National Development League

The National Development League consisted of a number of clubs which included:

Berwick
Lasswade
Stirling University
Strathaven
Strathclyde University

National 7s competition

Annually, a National 7s competition was traditionally held on the first weekend of May. For five years, it was held at Portobello Rugby Club in Edinburgh. The normal format was for teams to be split into two pools, with semi-finalists chosen through the top 2 winners of the pools.

Scottish Universities Championship

The Scottish Universities Championship was not run by the SWRU, instead it was administered by the British University and Colleges Sport.

Winners:

2008 - 2009 : University of St Andrews
2007 - 2008 : Glasgow University
2006 - 2007 : Edinburgh University
2005 - 2006 : Edinburgh University

Representative Rugby

In the 2006-2007 season, there were 4 tiers of women's representative teams run and managed by the SWRU, in order:

Scotland Women's, the national team
Scotland Women's Development, a development team which acts as a feeder to the national team
Scotland Academy, a squad consisting of HE/FE players which attend a number of skills clinics
Scotland U18s, the Under 18s team

References

External links
Scotland Women Scottish Rugby Union 
2006 WRWC Homepage
247.tv - Live video and replays of all the Women's Rugby World Cup matches

Women's rugby union in Scotland
Rugby Union
Rugby union governing bodies in Scotland